In enzymology, a macrolide 2'-kinase is an enzyme that catalyzes the chemical reaction

ATP + oleandomycin  ADP + oleandomycin 2'-O-phosphate

Thus, the two substrates of this enzyme are ATP and oleandomycin, whereas its two products are ADP and oleandomycin 2'-O-phosphate.

This enzyme belongs to the family of transferases, specifically those transferring phosphorus-containing groups (phosphotransferases) with an alcohol group as acceptor.  The systematic name of this enzyme class is ATP:macrolide 2'-O-phosphotransferase.

References

 

EC 2.7.1
Enzymes of unknown structure